Lost in Alaska is a 1952 film starring the comedy team of Abbott and Costello.

Plot
The time is the 1890s, and the place is San Francisco. George Ball and Tom Watson are firemen who rescue 'Nugget' Joe McDermott from committing suicide by drowning.  Joe wants to die because his girlfriend, Rosette no longer loves him.  The boys keep an eye on him and Joe is thankful for it after receiving a telegram the next morning from Rosette claiming that she still loves him. George and Tom take their gold reward to the bank when they learn the police mistakenly believe Joe was murdered for his gold that night by the two men who actually rescued. They catch up to Joe on his boat for the Yukon and try to get him down to the police station only to see the ship depart San Francisco with all three of them on it.

Joe returns to Alaska, with George and Tom anxious to get him back to San Francisco to clear their names. Once they arrive, it is learned that many people want to kill Joe, as he was once the local sheriff who had many people hanged. They also find that a group of Joe's old friends also want him dead as they are the beneficiaries of his will. Rosette works at a casino whose owner, Jake Stillman, demands that she marry Joe, whom Jake also plans to kill once he is married to Rosette, so that he can gain the fortune in gold.

Rosette reveals Jake's intent to George and Tom, who hide Joe and Rosette by sending them out of town.  Jake is not happy about this turn of events and sends his gang to deal with George and Tom, who manage to outwit them.  In the ensuing melee, the gold falls into a deep crevice in the ice, and is lost.  Everyone manages to overcome their greed for the sake of friendship, and Joe and Rosette marry.

Cast
Bud Abbott as Tom Watson
 Lou Costello as George Bell
 Mitzi Green as Rosetta
 Tom Ewell as 'Nugget Joe' McDermott
 Bruce Cabot as Jake Stillman
 Emory Parnell as Sherman
 Jack Ingram as Henchman
 Rex Lease as Old Timer

Production
Lost in Alaska was filmed from December 3 through December 31, 1951, under the working title The Sourdoughs.

Legal problems
Production on the film almost never began.  One month before filming began, Abbott and Costello filed a lawsuit against Universal, which was selling 16mm clips (through Castle Films) taken from various Abbott and Costello films.  They also sued Realart Pictures for re-releasing some of the team's older films without their consent.

However, they settled for $2 million and additional profits from several of their prior films. Two weeks after the settlement, they re-signed with Universal through 1955.

Home media
This film has been released twice on DVD.  The first time, on The Best of Abbott and Costello Volume Three, on August 3, 2004, and again on October 28, 2008 as part of Abbott and Costello: The Complete Universal Pictures Collection.

References

External links

1952 films
1952 comedy films
American comedy films
American black-and-white films
Abbott and Costello films
1950s English-language films
Films directed by Jean Yarbrough
Universal Pictures films
Films set in Alaska
1950s American films